Nico Schmidt (born 20 August 1978) is a German wrestler. He won the World Military Championships in 2001, and finished third in 2000. He also participated in the 2009 and 2011 World Wrestling Championships. Schmidt is a fireman by profession.

Biography 
He won a bronze medal in the Greco-Roman super-heavyweight division at the 2009 European Wrestling Championships. At the 2012  Dave Schultz Memorial International he was defeated by Sgt. 1st Class Dremiel Byers.

References

1978 births
Living people
German male sport wrestlers
European Wrestling Championships medalists
20th-century German people
21st-century German people